Boyfriend Maker is a dating sim, chatbot, romance bot smartphone app for iOS (iPhone) and Android devices, developed by Japanese studio 36 You Games (styled as 36You) and distributed under the freemium business model. According to the developer's website, Boyfriend Maker is an "app that lets you interact and chat with quirky virtual boyfriends". Boyfriend Maker functions in a similar way as a game, since users can achieve various levels as they continue using the app. While each virtual boyfriend has certain unique characteristics, the various instances of the boyfriend are powered by a chat engine that (at least within a language and market) can utilise vocabulary and knowledge acquired in a chat with one user in subsequent chats with other users.

Apple delisting and reintroduction
In late November 2012, the original iOS Boyfriend Maker app was delisted from the Apple App Store due to "ribald" (i.e. lewd) chat, according to the New York Times. According to the website polygon.com, Boyfriend Maker was removed by Apple due to "reports of references to violent sexual acts and pedophilia". The polygon.com article notes that Boyfriend Maker had an age rating of 4+, even though the chat bot "responds with often strange and explicit text unsuitable for young children". User-posted chat excerpts do indicate that the virtual boyfriend would sometimes transition abruptly to flirtatious cybersex chat in response to a seemingly innocent question. In one a user-posted example, in response to the question, "what kind of wedding cake will we have" the boyfriend responds, "a good sex ima be on top of u u gonna ride oon me bitin the pillow gurrl ima fuck da shit out of u". According to the polygon.com article, "The developer's use of the SimSimi-created third-party chat engine is believed to be responsible for highly sexual chat text." As the virtual boyfriend converses with human users, the SimSimi chat engine acquires vocabulary from users of the game and applies this "learned" vocabulary in chats with other users. The chat engine might also employ lines harvested from human-human chat logs, song lyrics, movies or TV shows. In April, 2013, a detuned and presumably tamer version of the app, titled Boyfriend Plus, was permitted on Apple's App Store.

Customizable appearance
Users can customize their virtual boyfriend's appearance by selecting items such as hair, clothing, face, and a necklace.

See also
Artificial intelligence
Natural language processing
Natural language understanding
Natural language generation

References

2012 video games
Android (operating system) games
Dating sims
IOS games
Video games developed in Japan